Protesilaus aguiari  is a species of butterfly found in the Neotropical realm in the Brazilian states of Pará and Amazonas.

Status
No known threats.

References

Further reading
D'Abrera, B. (1981). Butterflies of the Neotropical Region. Part I. Papilionidae and Pieridae. Lansdowne Editions, Melbourne, xvi + 172 pp.

External links
 Butterflies of the Americas Images of holotype.

Papilionidae
Fauna of Brazil
Papilionidae of South America
Butterflies described in 1937